The Brown Boveri electric locomotive was an electric locomotive type originally operated by Ferrocarriles Vascongados in the Basque Country, Spain. When that company was absorbed by FEVE, it came to be known as the FEVE 4000 series. It was later operated by Euskotren.

History
Due to an increase in traffic, Ferrocarriles Vascongados decided in the 1920s to electrify its main line between Bilbao and San Sebastián. Correspondingly, the company ordered nine (later 10) electric locomotives in May 1927 for hauling freight trains and heavy passenger trains. They were numbered 1 to 10. Like other locomotives, they were nicknamed  due to their distinctive shape. While originally painted in red and cream colors, the locomotives were repainted in a less distinctive grey and green color scheme during the Spanish Civil War.

After the original operator was absorbed into FEVE in 1972, the locomotives were renumbered as 4001 to 4010. This period saw a decline in freight traffic which coupled with the retirement of some multiple unit types meant the 4000 series was increasingly used to haul local train services. It was during this time that the locomotives had their axleboxes changed, the most significant overhaul during their lifetime. After the establishment of Euskotren in 1982 (known at the time as ET/FV), they were transferred to the new company. They were gradually retired from service starting in 1988, with some locomotives being used to haul tourist trains up to 1999.

Technology 
The locomotive has a undercarriage that consists of two two-axle carriages with a cross-bearing drive, which are connected to each other with a close coupling. The axle bearings are designed as Isothermos bearings.

The superstructures do not transmit tractive force and serve only to protect the electrical equipment. They consist of a central part in the form of a shorter locomotive body with the two cabs and the two scissor pantographs and two front bodies. The superstructures, on which the third headlight is also placed, use the whole width of the vehicle.

In the central part, between the two cabs, is the apparatus room with a central aisle. On one side are the high-voltage cell, the cam controller, the vacuum pump for the train brake, and the compressor for the pantographs and whistle. On the other are the low-voltage frame, the quick-action switch, the converter for the control power supply, the batteries, and the traction motor fan. The cam gear is mechanically driven by the handwheels of the master controllers in the cabs via a chain transmission. A hand air pump allows the pantograph to be lifted without compressed air.

The starting resistors are located in the front ends. The two CMTD-type traction motors of a bogie form a group permanently connected in series. When starting up, both groups are connected in series on the first nine speed steps, and on the next five speed steps they are connected in parallel, followed by two field weakening stages. The locomotives have no electric brake. The traction motors were cooled by the fan with two fan wheels located in the engine room, which sucked in the cooling air in the lower area of the side wall and directed it through floor ducts to the traction motors in the undercarriage.

Numbering and naming
The locomotives were named after mountains of the Basque Country. Their individual details are as follows.

See also
 Ferrocarriles Vascongados § Rolling stock

References

External links
 

Electric locomotives of Spain
Euskotren rolling stock
FEVE rolling stock
Ferrocarriles Vascongados rolling stock
Railway locomotives introduced in 1928
Brown, Boveri & Cie locomotives
Bo′Bo′ locomotives
Bo-Bo locomotives
Metre gauge electric locomotives
1500 V DC locomotives